Elections to the Territorial Assembly of Wallis and Futuna were held on 26 March 2017.

Turnout 
Voter turnout was reportedly higher than in 2012.

Elected members

References 

Elections in Wallis and Futuna
Assembly election
Wallis
Wallis
Wallis